Mount Winchell, a thirteener, is among the thirty highest peaks of California. It is in the Palisades region of the Sierra Nevada, on the Sierra Crest between Mount Agassiz and Thunderbolt Peak.

Geography 
The Inyo-Kern County line follows Winchell's northwest-southeast ridges. Hydrologically, this same boundary divides the Big Pine Creek drainage from Dusy Basin, part of the Kings River's headwaters. Its west slopes fall within Kings Canyon National Park, while its east slopes are in the John Muir Wilderness of the Inyo National Forest.

History 

Two mountain peaks in the vicinity were christened Mount Winchell during the 1870s, but neither of them were present day Mount Winchell. The United States Geological Survey applied the name to the present peak. The name's original application was made by Elisha Winchell for his cousin, Alexander Witchell, who was a founding member of the Geological Society of America.

The first recorded climb of Mount Winchell was by Harvey C. Mansfield, Sr., John M. Newell, and Windsor B. Putnam, in June 1923. Their route, a  scramble up the east arête, is the least technical route. The first known winter climb by Norman Clyde, Morgan Harris, and David Brower used this same route in January 1938.

See also 

 Mountain peaks of California
 Palisades of the Sierra Nevada
 Thirteener

References

External links 
 

Mountains of Kings Canyon National Park
Mountains of the John Muir Wilderness
Mountains of Fresno County, California
Mountains of Inyo County, California
Mountains of Northern California